Choi Seung-in (born March 5, 1991) is a South Korean football player who plays for German club LSK Hansa.

Club statistics
As of 21 December 2019

References

External links
 
 

1991 births
Living people
South Korean footballers
Association football forwards
Shonan Bellmare players
Zweigen Kanazawa players
Gangwon FC players
Busan IPark players
Lüneburger SK Hansa players
K League 1 players
J1 League players
Japan Football League players
K League 2 players
Oberliga (football) players
South Korean expatriate footballers
South Korean expatriate sportspeople in Japan
Expatriate footballers in Japan
South Korean expatriate sportspeople in Germany
Expatriate footballers in Germany